Luogang station, is a station of Line 6 of the Guangzhou Metro. It started operations on 28 December 2016.

Station layout

Exits

References

Railway stations in China opened in 2016
Guangzhou Metro stations in Huangpu District